Hancheng is a city in Shaanxi Province, People's Republic of China, about 125 miles northeast of Xi'an, at the point where the south-flowing Yellow River enters the Guanzhong Plain. It is a renowned historic city, containing numerous historic mansions and streets as well as over 140 protected historical sites that range from the Tang to the Qing dynasties. As of 2005, it has a population of around 385,000 people.

History

In ancient times, Yu the Great bored a tunnel in the nearby Mount Longmen (Dragon Gate Mountain) to alleviate the frequent flooding that occurred in the area, which led to the area being called Dragon Gate. During the Western Zhou Dynasty, the area was bestowed on the Han Marquises. During the Spring and Autumn period, the area was under the administration of the State of Jin and became known as Hanyuan or "Land of the Hans." In the Warring States period, the area belonged to the State of Wei and was called Shaoliang. Towards the end of the Warring States Period, the State of Qin conquered and designated the area as Xiayang County. In the Sui Dynasty, the area received its present name of Hancheng.

In 1983, Hancheng County became Hancheng City. In 1986, the city was named a National Historic and Cultural City and,

Administrative divisions
As 2019, Hancheng City is divided to 3 subdistricts and 6 towns.
Subdistricts
 Xincheng Subdistrict 
 Jincheng Subdistrict

Towns

Climate

Economy
Hancheng has the biggest power plant in western China, generating over 2,400,000 kW.

Culture
The famed Chinese historian Sima Qian was born in Hancheng in the Han Dynasty and buried nearby.

See also
 Dangjia village, Xizhuang

References

External links
Hancheng government website  
Famous historical names from 韓城 : 清朝第一位陕西籍状元王杰 

Cities in Shaanxi